The 2013 Moroccan Throne Cup was the 57th edition of the Moroccan Throne Cup.

The defending champions were Raja de Casablanca.

The winner of the competition would qualify for the preliminary round of the CAF Confederation Cup.

Final phases

Last 32

Last 16

Quarter-finals

Semi-finals 
The matches were played at the Fez Stadium.

Final 
The match was played on 18 November 2013 at the Prince Moulay Abdellah Stadium.

Winner

See also 

 2013–14 Botola

Notes and references 

2013–14 in Moroccan football